Jinchang (金昌) is a prefecture-level city in Gansu, China.

Jinchang or Jin Chang or variant may also refer to:

Places
Jinchang District (金阊区), former district of Suzhou, Jiangsu, China
Jinchang Commandery (晉昌郡), historical division established in the Jin dynasty

People

Given name "Jin" surnamed "Chang"
 Chang Jin (Chinese: 常进; born 1966). Chinese astronomer
 Jang Jin (장진, 張鎭; born 1971; aka Chang Jin), a South Korean film director

See also

 
 
 Changjin (disambiguation)
 Chang (disambiguation)
 Jin (disambiguation)